Abū al-Ḥusayn Aḥmad ibn ʿAbd Allāh ibn Muḥammad ibn Ismāʿīl, better known as Muḥammad al-Taqī (born , died , Salamiyah, Syria, Imam: –) is the ninth Ismāʿīlī Imam. As the Imam, he was the supreme spiritual leader of the Ismāʿīlī community from his appointment until his death.  The Nizari and Musta'li trace their Imamate lines from him and his descendants who founded the Fatimid Caliphate.  He was succeeded by his son, al-Ḥusayn ibn Aḥmad / ʿAbd Allāh al-Raḍī. 

The 8th to 10th Ismāʿīlī Imams were hidden from the public, because of threats from the Abbasid caliphate, and were known by their nicknames. However, the Dawoodi Bohra in their religious text, Taqqarub, claim to have the true names of all 21 imams in sequence including those "hidden" imams: 8th Imam Abd Allah ibn Muhammad (Ahmad al-Wafi), 9th Imam Ahmad ibn Abd Allah (Muhammad al-Taqi), and the 10th Imam Husayn ibn Ahmad (Abd Allah al-Radi).

Ismaili Da'i, Idris Imad al-Din, in his book, Uyun al-Akhbar, claimed that Ahmad authored the epic  Encyclopedia of the Brethren of Purity, concealing his identity, to fight against abrogation of Islam by Ashr'ites and Mu'tazilites, and rising religious intolerance among Muslims during the reign of Abbasids, especially during the period of Mihna instigated by the caliph, Al-Ma'mun.

See also
 List of Isma'ili imams
 Family tree linking Prophets to Shi'ite Imams

References

 

Ismaili imams
810s births
840 deaths

9th-century Arabs